Enrique Acevedo (born March 6, 1978) is a Mexican journalist who currently anchors the flagship En punto  the nightly newscast for Televisa since 2023. He previously served as correspondent for CBS News where he reported across multiple broadcasts and platforms. At CBS he has covered a wide range of topics including the 2020 Presidential Election, the U.S. troop withdrawal from Afghanistan, and the violence against journalists in Mexico. He was an Emmy award-winning correspondent on the 60 Minutes program 60 MINUTES Plus. He is the first Latino correspondent in the 54-year history of 60 Minutes.

Throughout his career, Enrique Acevedo has covered the most important news around the world, with a focus on raising the voices of vulnerable communities. Committed to delivering news to a wide audience, he has turned his skills to print, broadcast and digital media, and co-wrote and co-produced 30 Segundos, a documentary about young Latino voters and the 2016 US presidential election. .

He sits on the board of directors of the News Literacy Project, a nonpartisan, nonprofit organization that works with educators and journalists to give students the skills they need to discern fact from fiction and to know what content to trust.

Education
Acevedo has a master's degree in journalism from Columbia University Graduate School of Journalism. He was a Pritzker Fellow at the University of Chicago Institute of Politics in 2019.

Career
Acevedo has covered the news around the world including Fidel Castro's funeral in Cuba, the 2011 Tōhoku earthquake and tsunami in Japan, the humanitarian crisis in Haiti, and the drug wars in Mexico and Latin America.  During the 2016 presidential cycle, he co-moderated Univision's Democratic Debate and led the network's electoral coverage alongside Maria Elena Salinas and Jorge Ramos.

He has interviewed President Barack Obama; philanthropist Melinda Gates; and Nobel Peace Prize winners Jody Williams, Desmond Tutu, Kofi Annan, and Juan Manuel Santos.

During his almost 10 years as the anchor of Noticiero Univision Edición Nocturna, the newscast became one of the most-watched Spanish-language broadcasts in the U.S. His work has been published in The New York Times, The Washington Post , El Pais, Reforma, Milenio, Letras Libres, Fusion and The New York Review of Magazines. He is a frequent contributor on NPR's Here and Now. He co-wrote and co-produced the documentary 30 Segundos about young Latino voters and the 2016 presidential election.

Recognitions and studies
His work in Japan was featured as part of the Journalism School's centennial celebration in a book commemorating the best 100 stories in the last century. He's the recipient of a News & Documentary Emmy Award in the Outstanding Newscast or News Magazine category. In 2019 he was the recipient of the News Literacy Project’s John S. Carroll Journalist of the Year Award for his contributions to News Literacy and identifying bias in news. He's also been awarded the National Journalism prize by Mexico's Press Club on two occasions

He's been recognized as one of the "Top Latinos in American Newsrooms," by the Huffington Post and a "Global Media Leader" by the World Economic Forum .

Personal life
On November 29, 2014, he married Florentina Romo in San Miguel de Allende.

References

External links 
 Global Media Leaders-World Economic Forum
 Contributors-ABC/Univision
 Opinión-El Pais
 Revista Letras Libres
 Opinión-Univision Noticias
 Opinión-La Razón
 Immigration Shows How Politics Drive Policy
 Mexico’s future starts with rule of law and education reform
 Enrique Acevedo Tapped as Univision Late Evening News Anchor – TV Newser
 Univision Noticias Edicion Nocturna outperforms all ABC,CBS and NBC Late-Night Shows – TV by the Numbers
 Huffington Post
 NPR Here and Now

1978 births
Living people
21st-century Mexican journalists
Mexican journalists
Male journalists
Mexican news anchors